The R65s  are New York City Subway work service cars built around 1989 by Kawasaki Heavy Industries in Kobe, Japan. They are similar-looking to the R62 and R62A passenger cars and built to IRT specifications, but can be found on either division. They are numbered PC01–PC03 and used to pump out water from flooded tunnels and open cut areas. Unlike their revenue service counterparts, the R65s cannot move under their own power; they are always propelled by diesel locomotives.

References

External links
NYCSubway.org

Train-related introductions in 1989
New York City Subway rolling stock
Kawasaki rolling stock
1989 in rail transport